"Desert Song" is a song by English hard rock band Def Leppard from their 1993 rarities and 'B-sides' album Retro Active.

Background
This song was an outtake from the songwriting sessions that produced 1987's Hysteria. Self-produced, it became one of the last songs to be released by Def Leppard bearing the songwriting and guitar-playing of Steve Clark, who died on 8 January 1991. It was a hit on U.S. rock radio, reaching number twelve on the Mainstream Rock Tracks chart. It was recorded as an instrumental for their album Hysteria (1987) but left off the album and was largely forgotten until the band decided to commit the song for Retro Active. On a day off during their 7 Day Weekend Tour, Elliott composed lyrics whilst listening to the track. Elliott assembled the band and remains the only Def Leppard song to feature both Clark's guitar playing and Clark's successor Vivian Campbell on background vocals, although Campbell's contributions are uncredited in the Retro Active liner notes.

Lyrically the song is about Mick Ronson who was dying of cancer at the time. It told the story of a man facing death alone.

Charts

References

Def Leppard songs
1993 singles
1987 songs
Commemoration songs
Songs written by Steve Clark
Songs written by Joe Elliott
Songs written by Rick Savage